= Spring City Metro Post =

Chinese newspaper

- Type: Metro newspaper
- Founded: December 26, 2012
- Ceased publication: January 1, 2019
- Website: ccdtb.clzg.cn

The Spring City Metro Post, or Chuncheng Ditie bao (Chinese: 春城地铁报), was a Kunming-based Chinese morning newspaper. It was founded on December 26, 2012, as a subsidiary of Kunming Press Media Group (昆明报业传媒集团).

== History ==
On the first day of the release of the Spring City Metro Post, 200,000 copies of the newspaper were distributed free of charge throughout Kunming for 3 days.

On January 1, 2019, the Post ceased publication.
